Ghosts... of the Civil Dead is a 1988 Australian drama-suspense film directed by John Hillcoat. It was written by Hillcoat, Evan English, Gene Conkie, Nick Cave and Hugo Race. It is partly based on the true story of Jack Henry Abbott.

Synopsis 
The story is set in Central Industrial Prison, a privately run maximum security prison in the middle of the Australian desert. An outbreak of violence within the prison has resulted in a total lockdown. A committee is appointed by the prison's governors to investigate the cause of the outbreak, but their findings are in stark contrast to the facts behind the riot.

It is revealed that both the prisoners and the guards are slowly and deliberately brutalised, manipulated and provoked into the forthcoming eruption of violence by the government and the private company that runs the prison, in order to justify the construction of a new and more "secure" facility.

Production 
The script was based on the book In the Belly of the Beast by Jack Henry Abbott and research done with David Hale, a former prison guard at Marion, Illinois. The film was shot at a disused aircraft factory in Melbourne in October and November.

Origin of title 

In Roman law, a person convicted of a crime where the punishment included loss of their legal rights as a person was civiliter mortuus, a person without civil rights.

Reception

Accolades

Legacy 
The spoken line "Welcome to Central Industrial. We are the future" has been sampled by Future Sound of London in their song "Central Industrial" on their Accelerator album; also sampled by Woob in their song "Void, Part One" on the album em:t 0094, and by Jam and Spoon in their remix of Moby's "Go".

Sonic Subjunkies samples various parts of the film in their songs "Central Industrial" and "Central Industrial II: The Lockdown".

Therapy? opened the song "Nausea" (the first one on their 1992 album Nurse) with a sample of Nick Cave shouting "Here I am, motherfuckers!" in the film.

Bibliography 
 Fuchs, Christian [1996] (2002). Bad Blood. Creation Books

References

External links 
 
 
Ghosts... of the Civil Dead at Oz Movies
 
 
 Ghosts... of The Civil Dead at the National Film and Sound Archive

1988 films
1988 drama films
Australian drama films
1980s prison drama films
Films shot in Melbourne
Films directed by John Hillcoat
Films scored by Nick Cave
Films with screenplays by Nick Cave
1980s English-language films